Bonnie G. Smith is the current Board of Governors Distinguished History Professor at Rutgers University, New Brunswick. 

Smith attended Smith College, earning a bachelor's degree there in 1962. Later, she earned a Ph.D. from the University of Rochester in 1976. She has since held fellowships from the Guggenheim Foundation, the Shelby Cullom Davis Center for Historical Studies at Princeton University, the American Council of Learned Societies, the National Humanities Center, and the University of Rochester.

Smith designed a project, co-sponsored by the Organization of American Historians, to integrate the study of women into survey courses. She has been on the board of editors of French Historical Studies, a consulting editor to Feminist Studies, and on the board of associate editors for Journal of Women's History.

Her primary focus began with the histories of the French Empire in the post Industrial age. Since then, Smith's research interests concern issues of Cultural Hybridity in the Modern West, Gendering Disability, Women's and Gender History in Global Perspective, Europe in the Twentieth Century World, and Women in World History.

Bonnie Smith was also the script writer for the Crash Course European History YouTube series, hosted by John Green.

Selected works
The Making of the West Concise, co-author with Lynn Hunt, Thomas Martin, and Barbara Rosenwein, 4th edition (Bedford St. Martin’s 2013)
Women’s Studies: The Basics (Routledge, 2013)
The Gender of History: Men, Women, and Historical Practice, Chinese edition, 2012
The Making of the West: Peoples and Cultures, co-author with Lynn Hunt, Thomas Martin, and Barbara Rosenwein, 4th edition (Bedford St. Martin’s 2012)
Sources of Crossroads and Cultures with Marc Van de Mieroop, Richard von Glahn, and Kris Lane (Bedford St. Martins, 2012)
Crossroads and Cultures: A History of the World’s Peoples, co-author with Marc Van de Mieroop, Richard von Glahn, and Kris Lane (Bedford St. Martins, 2012)
Decentered Identities: The Case of the Romantics, History, and Theory, May 2011
"Women in World History: An Overview", for Clio. Femmes, genre, histoire, twenty-fifth anniversary edition, January 2011
Europe in the Contemporary World, 1900 to the Present, 2nd edition (Bloomsbury Academic, 2022)

References

1940 births
Living people
Rutgers University faculty
Smith College alumni
University of Rochester alumni
21st-century American historians